Vijay Singhal is an Indian Administrative Service officer and the current chairman and managing director of Maharashtra State Electricity Distribution Company Limited.

References

Indian Administrative Service officers